The women's football tournament at the 2008 Summer Olympics in Beijing was held from 6 to 21 August 2008. The women's tournament was a full international tournament with no restrictions on age. The twelve national teams involved in the tournament were required to register a squad of 18 players, including two goalkeepers. Additionally, teams could name a maximum of four alternate players, numbered from 19 to 22. The alternate list could contain at most three outfielders, as at least one slot was reserved for a goalkeeper. In the event of serious injury during the tournament, an injured player could be replaced by one of the players in the alternate list. Only players in these squads were eligible to take part in the tournament.

The age listed for each player is on 6 August 2008, the first day of the tournament. The numbers of caps and goals listed for each player do not include any matches played after the start of the tournament. The club listed is the club for which the player last played a competitive match prior to the tournament. A flag is included for coaches who are of a different nationality than their own national team.

Group E

Argentina
Head coach: Carlos Borrello

Argentina named a squad of 18 players and 4 alternates for the tournament.

Canada
Head coach:  Even Pellerud

Canada named a squad of 18 players and 4 alternates for the tournament. Prior to the tournament, Amber Allen withdrew injured and was replaced on 3 August 2008 by Jodi-Ann Robinson, who was initially selected as an alternate player. Chelsea Stewart subsequently filled the vacant alternate spot.

China PR
Head coach: Shang Ruihua

China PR named a squad of 18 players and 4 alternates for the tournament.

Sweden
Head coach: Thomas Dennerby

Sweden named a squad of 18 players and 4 alternates for the tournament. During the tournament, Maria Aronsson replaced Josefine Öqvist on 12 August 2008 due to injury.

Group F

Brazil
Head coach: Jorge Barcellos

Brazil named a squad of 18 players and 4 alternates for the tournament.

Germany
Head coach: Silvia Neid

Germany named a squad of 18 players and 4 alternates for the tournament.

Nigeria
Head coach: Joseph Ladipo

Nigeria named a squad of 18 players and 4 alternates for the tournament.

North Korea
Head coach: Kim Kwang-min

North Korea named a squad of 18 players and no alternates for the tournament.

Group G

Japan
Head coach: Norio Sasaki

Japan named a squad of 18 players and 4 alternates for the tournament.

New Zealand
Head coach:  John Herdman

New Zealand named a squad of 18 players and 4 alternates for the tournament.

Norway
Head coach: Bjarne Berntsen

Norway named a squad of 18 players and 4 alternates for the tournament.

United States
Head coach:  Pia Sundhage

The United States named a squad of 18 players and 4 alternates for the tournament. Prior to the tournament, Abby Wambach withdrew injured and was replaced on 17 July 2008 by Lauren Cheney, who was initially selected as an alternate player. India Trotter subsequently filled the vacant alternate spot.

References

External links
 Olympic Football Tournaments Beijing 2008 – Women, FIFA.com

Squads
2008